Raymond "Ray" Ozzie (born November 20, 1955) is an American software industry entrepreneur who held the positions of Chief Technical Officer and Chief Software Architect at Microsoft between 2005 and 2010. Before Microsoft, he was best known for his role in creating Lotus Notes.

Biography
He grew up in Chicago, Illinois, later moving to Park Ridge, Illinois and graduating from Maine South High School in 1973 where, in 1969, he learned to program on a GE-400 mainframe and an Olivetti-Underwood Programma 101.

He received his bachelor's degree in computer science in 1979 from the University of Illinois at Urbana-Champaign, where he worked on the PLATO system, and began his working career at  Data General Corporation where he worked for Jonathan Sachs.  After leaving Data General, Ozzie worked at Software Arts for Dan Bricklin and Bob Frankston, the creators of VisiCalc, on that product and TK Solver.  Shortly thereafter, he was recruited by Sachs and Mitch Kapor to work for Lotus Development to develop what became Lotus Symphony.  Ozzie left Lotus Development in 1984 and founded Iris Associates to create the product later sold by Lotus as Lotus Notes, based in part on his experiences using the PLATO Notes group messaging system. Iris Associates was acquired by Lotus in 1994, and Lotus itself was acquired by IBM in 1995.

Ozzie worked there for several years before leaving to form Groove Networks. Groove was acquired by Microsoft in 2005, where Ozzie became one of three Chief Technical Officers. That year, he wrote a seven-page, 5,000-word internal memo, titled The Internet Services Disruption: "It's clear that if we fail to do so, our business as we know it is at risk ... We must respond quickly and decisively."

On June 15, 2006, Ozzie took over the role of Chief Software Architect from Bill Gates.

In October 2008 Ozzie announced Microsoft Azure, the first project to emerge from his advanced development labs focused on new and potentially disruptive approaches to Microsoft's business. The project, originally known as "Red Dog", was led by Dave Cutler and Amitabh Srivastava.  In January 2009, another project emerging from these labs, "Live Mesh", received a Crunchie Award for best technology innovation. In October 2009 he also created FUSE Labs (Future Social Experiences) within this advanced development unit, focusing on innovation in social experiences for mobile and web.

Ozzie officially announced his plans to step down from his role at Microsoft on October 18, 2010 and his final day was December 31, 2010. In 2011 he helped create the non-profit Safecast.

In January 2012 Ozzie started Talko Inc., a company that delivered mobile apps and services for business team communications primarily focused on those roles in which voice is essential. Talko was launched in September 2014. Ozzie has said that the name "Talko" was meant as an homage to Talkomatic, a popular group chat program he experienced while working on the PLATO System in the 1970s. Ray sold the company to Microsoft in December 2015 with the intent to bring Talko's novel voice and productivity features to Microsoft's Skype.

In 2013, Ozzie joined the board of directors at Hewlett-Packard, and continues to serve as a director of Hewlett Packard Enterprise. He joined the board of Safecast in 2017.

In April 2020, Ray Ozzie raised $11 million for his new venture, Blues Wireless, an IoT company.

Awards and honors
Ozzie was elected a member of the National Academy of Engineering in 2004 for the conception and development of online collaboration products, including Lotus Notes.

See also
Windows Pioneers

References

External links

 

Microsoft employees
Grainger College of Engineering alumni
American chief executives
1955 births
Living people
Businesspeople from Chicago
People from Park Ridge, Illinois
American computer businesspeople
American chief technology officers